Vasil Petrov Delov (December 25, 1861 – November 16, 1938) was a 20th-century Bulgarian officer and major general.

Biography
Vasil Delov was born on December 25, 1861, in the town of Kotel, Vasil was the child of his father, Petar Hadjinikolov and mother, Teodora Krastevich. The paternal family is from the family of Georgi Rakovski. His mother was the sister of Gavril Krastevich. He received his primary education in his hometown. He graduated from Aprilov High School. Initially he studied in his hometown, and then at the Gabrovo High School until its closure. Then he went to Tulcea to study.

During the Russo-Turkish War (1877-1878) he was in the town of Tulcea. There he prepared to study in Russia under Sava Dobroplodni. He spoke French, German and Russian and was Secretary of the Tulcea Bulgarian Municipality in 1878.

In 1879, he graduated with the first class of the Vasil Levski National Military University in Sofia. Actual military service began in the 20th Infantry Company of Varna in 1879. He is actively involved in the construction of the Bulgarian Land Forces. He published The Ordinary Soldiers in the Infantry, which was the first training manual in the Bulgarian Army. Followed by "Guide for non-commissioned officers in the study of loose formation", "Trenches for infantry with drawings", "Guide for officers in training in fencing", "Table for fighting with a knife with drawings", "On disciplinary sanctions and gymnastics". He was awarded the Order of Merit. Company commander in the Varna company.

During the Serbo-Bulgarian War of 1885 he was commander of the 2nd Company of the 8th Primorski Infantry Regiment. In the Battle of Tsaribrod on November 11 and 12 he commanded the section of Babina Glava Peak. Under heavy enemy fire, occupying the opposite Neshkov Peak, he decided to attack it, despite orders from the High Command to wait for reinforcements. As a result of the attack, the summit was captured and the Serbian army was forced to withdraw to Pirot. He was awarded the Order of Courage IV degree. is serving in the 24th Black Sea Infantry Regiment as a company commander.

After the war he was commander of the 22nd Thracian Infantry Regiment (1892), the 9th Plovdiv Infantry Regiment (1893). Colonel since 1896. Served in the Vidin garrison as commander of the 3rd Bdina Infantry Regiment. Commander of the 1st Brigade of the 6th, and then of the 2nd Brigade of the 2nd Thracian Infantry Division (1901 - 1912) .

During the First Balkan War, he was chief of the Haskovo detachment. In the Battle of Kardzhali he drove the Turks south of the Arda River and secured the rear of the 2nd Bulgarian Army near Edirne . He was then appointed commander of the 11th Infantry Combined Division . In March 1913, as head of the Southern Department of the Eastern Sector, he took part in the siege and assault on the Edirne Fortress . He was promoted to the rank of Major General .

At the beginning of the Second Balkan War, he commanded the 11th Infantry Division, and towards the end, in the Battle of Kresna Gorge, he was at the head of the Western Rhodope Detachment. From October 1914 he was dismissed from active service and passed into the reserves on his own.

During World War I, he was Head of Divisional tenth Aegean Region, General Orders in the War Department and Head of the 2 nd divisional area (1918). He resigned in 1919. He settled with his family in Plovdiv.

Writing his memoirs in 1936, Delov noted:

Major General Vasil Delov died in Plovdiv on November 16, 1938. A bust of him was erected in the town of Kardzhali.

Awards
Order of Bravery, III and IV degree, 2nd class
Order of Saint Alexander, III degree with swords, IV and V degree
Order of Military Merit, III and IV degree
Order of Merit
Stara Planina, I degree with swords, posthumously

References

Bibliography
 Rumenin, Rumen. The Officer Corps in Bulgaria 1878 - 1944. Vol. 1 and 2. Sofia, Publishing House of the Ministry of Defense "St. George the Victorious ”, 1996. p. 235.
 Nedev, S., The Command of the Bulgarian Army during the Wars of National Unification, Sofia, 1993, Military Publishing Complex "St. George the Victorious ”, p. 95
 

Bulgarian generals
Bulgarian military personnel of the Balkan Wars
Bulgarian military personnel of World War I
People of the Serbo-Bulgarian War
Recipients of the Order of Military Merit (Bulgaria)
Recipients of the Order of St. Anna, 1st class
Defence ministers of Bulgaria
1861 births
1938 deaths